Carroll Creek is a stream in the U.S. state of South Dakota.

History
Carroll Creek has the name of Ben Carroll, an early settler.

See also
List of rivers of South Dakota

References

Rivers of Custer County, South Dakota
Rivers of South Dakota